The International Video Game Hall of Fame (IVGHoF) is a planned museum to be operated in Ottumwa, Iowa, United States.

Ottumwa considers itself as the "Video Game Capital of the World" as the city was home to the Twin Galaxies arcade which became the epicenter for numerous competitions in arcade games. The museum's organization is operated as a 501(c)(3) non-profit by Ottumwa business leaders and other residents, designed to recognize "the champions, industries, and professionals" of the video game industry. While the museum has not been constructed, the IVGHoF continues to induct new members into its Hall of Fame.

History
The idea of the museum was conceived around 2009. The city laid claim that they were the Video Game Capital of the World in 1982, following the recognition that Twin Galaxies had received for being the authoritative source for high scores in arcade games, a point that had not been challenged since. Around 2009, community leaders started speculating on the possibility of a museum, recognizing that previous efforts to establish a United States video game museum had all failed and that this was potentially a way to capitalize on the city's claim to fame. Leaders recognized that since 1982, the video game industry had significantly changed, with arcade games having waned in favor of consoles and computers, but felt they could still be a proper home to this museum due to the town's history as Cooperstown, New York serves for the National Baseball Hall of Fame and Museum. The city leaders also saw the opportunity to help the financially struggling city to bring in more revenues from tourism to the primarily farming community.

The city's council and chamber of commerce authorized a steering committee to organize and plan out the museum. The museum's organizers aimed to collect donations to build a modern facility, estimated to cost between $30 to $50 million, with interactive displays to celebrate its inductees, and to acquire at least one working version of each of the estimated 100,000 coin-operated and home video game systems that have been produced to date. Their initial goal was to start construction within five years from its onset.

The museum inducted its first class during its multiday "Big Bang 2010" event on August 7, 2010. Inducted into the Hall of Fame during this initial ceremony included Nintendo's Shigeru Miyamoto, Namco's Masaya Nakamura, home video game system pioneers Ralph H. Baer and Nolan Bushnell, game designer Steve Ritchie, members of the original Xbox design team including Seamus Blackley, and several arcade game high-score champions including Steve Wiebe and Billy Mitchell. The event also honored Pac-Man on the 30th anniversary of the arcade game's release through induction into the Hall of Fame. The initial events drew in at least 3,500 visitors to the town. In subsequent years, due to low donations, the IVGHoF has scaled back these events, still holding ceremonies for honoring inductees, as to be able to better met their target goals.

In 2016, the IVGHoF and the town established the "Video Game Walk of Fame" along the town's main street, believed to be the first of its kind. While the IVGHoF itself focuses more on the people and organizations of the video game industry, the Video Game Walk of Fame was designed to commemorate key video games. In its inaugural year, the IVGHoF selected Pac-Man for the first "star" on this, and put into display on August 7, 2016, alongside the events to induct new members into the Hall of Fame.

Inductees
The IVGHoF selects inductees from both the industry and from players, as well as select video games. Selections are made first through an open nomination process, public input to narrow down the electees, and then voting among a set of video game journalists, executives, and gamers for final inductees.

Developers and industry leaders

Competitive gamers

Games

Community Action Award

Walter Day Lifetime Achievement Award

References

External links
 

2010 establishments in Iowa
Museums established in 2010
Video game museums
Halls of fame in Iowa
Museums in Wapello County, Iowa
Buildings and structures in Ottumwa, Iowa